The IBM international chess tournament was a series of very strong chess tournaments held in the Amsterdam, Netherlands from 1961 to 1981, and was sponsored by IBM. The list of winners of the main group includes five world champions. 

Parallel there was quite often a tournament IBM-B, always with (future or former) strong grandmasters - and local Dutch players to play against foreign titleholders, apart from the major "A" section. By 1963, there were 120 participants in the IBM Amsterdam tournament, broken down to grandmaster group, master group, reserve master group, etc. It was a real festival, connected with the idea to promote (chess) programming by sponsor IBM.

{| class="wikitable"
! # !! Year !! Winner 
|-
| 1||1961|| 
|-
| 2||1962||   
|-
| 3||1963|| 
|-
| 4||1964|| 
|-
| 5||1965|| 
|-
| 6||1966|| 
|-
| 7||1967|| 
|-
| 8||1968|| 
|-
| 9||1969|| 
|-
| 10||1970||   
|-
| 11||1971|| 
|-
| 12||1972|| 
|-
| 13||1973||    
|-
| 14||1974||     
|-
| 15||1975|| 
|-
| 16||1976||   
|-
| 17||1977|| 
|-
| 18||1978|| 
|-
| 19||1979||   
|-
| 20||1980|| 
|-
| 21||1981|| 
|}

See also
AVRO 1938 chess tournament
Max Euwe Memorial Tournament
List of strong chess tournaments

References

 IBM chess tournament from endgame.nl
 IBM chess tournament from Eric Delaire (full crosstables)

External links 
 Schaaksite (in Dutch) 

Chess competitions
Chess in the Netherlands
1961 in chess
1981 in chess
Recurring sporting events established in 1961
Recurring events disestablished in 1981
1961 establishments in the Netherlands
1981 disestablishments in the Netherlands
Chess
Sports competitions in Amsterdam